Charles Renard (1847–1905) born in Damblain, Vosges,  was a French military engineer.

Airships
After the Franco-Prussian War of 1870-1871 he started work on the design of airships at the French army aeronautical department. Together with Arthur C. Krebs and his brother Paul, in 1884 he constructed  La France, which made its maiden flight on 9 August 1884 at Chalais-Meudon, making a 23-minute circular flight.  This was the first time that a flying machine made a flight which returned to the place of take-off.  It was later exhibited at the Paris Exposition Universelle (1889).

Preferred numbers
He also proposed a now widely used system of preferred numbers known as Renard numbers that was later named after him and became international standard ISO 3. It helped the French army to reduce the number of different balloon ropes kept on inventory from 425 to 17.

Road Train
Colonel Renard invented the Renard Road Train first developed by Darracq and displayed by them in 1903 later developed in England by Daimler. The leading motor unit having generated the power transmits it by a continuous shaft united between the carriages by a universal joint to the driving wheels of each carriage. These, each carriage being six-wheeled, are the central pair and are shod with iron, the resulting road-shock being taken by the springs and rubber tyres on the other wheels. Each vehicle is steered by its predecessor through a series of rods and linkages and when a Renard train rounds a corner each vehicle follows precisely in the track of its predecessor. They were powered by a 16.1 litre Daimler engine and the last carriage always cut the corner

Academy
Depressed by the French government's refusal to fund his experiments and the rejection of his candidacy for membership of the French Académie des Sciences he committed suicide in April 1905. The Académie recognized his achievements by the award of the Prix Plumey for 1902 and the posthumous award of the Prix Poncelet for 1907.

See also
Arthur Constantin Krebs

References

 Hallion, Richard P., Taking Flight. New York: Oxford University Press, 2003

External links
 The pioneers: An anthology: Charles Renard
 Charles Renard
 Charles Renard
 US Centennial of Flight Commission

1847 births
1905 deaths
Ballooning
French engineers
Airship designers
1905 suicides